The Slaughterhouse is the thirtieth studio album by American recording artist Prince. It was released on March 29, 2004 by NPG Records. The album was released as MP3s through his website, NPG Music Club. The album's title comes from the first line of the song "Silicon," "Welcome 2 the slaughterhouse." The tracks consist of material previously available on the same website back in 2001, although some may have rearrangements of music and/or lyrics. "2045: Radical Man" was released on the soundtrack of Spike Lee's Bamboozled in 2001. "Peace" and "The Daisy Chain" were released as limited edition CD singles during Prince's 2001 Hit n Run Tour. In 2015, the album was released on the Tidal music service. It was made available on other online music services like Spotify and the iTunes Store in 2018.

Even though the album has never been officially released as a CD, there are bootlegs available.

Track listing
All songs written by Prince.
Tracks 2 and 5 credited to The Artist Formerly Known as Prince; tracks 7–10 credited to The New Power Generation.
 
 "Silicon" – 4:17
 "S&M Groove" – 5:10
 "Y Should 👁 Do That When 👁 Can Do This?" – 4:33
 "Golden Parachute" – 5:38
 "Hypnoparadise" – 6:05
 "Props 'n' Pounds" – 4:38
 "Northside" – 6:34
 "Peace" – 5:35
 "2045: Radical Man" – 6:34
 "The Daisy Chain" [*] – 6:13

[*] featuring rap from David "DVS" Schwartz

References

External links
 The Slaughterhouse at Everything2.com

2004 albums
Prince (musician) albums
Albums produced by Prince (musician)
NPG Records albums